The 1869 Hawick Burghs by-election was held on 4 January 1869.  The by-election was held due to the incumbent Liberal MP, George Otto Trevelyan, becoming Civil Lord of the Admiralty.  It was retained by Trevelyan who was unopposed.

References

Hawick
1869 elections in the United Kingdom
1869 in Scotland
1860s elections in Scotland
Politics of the Scottish Borders
By-elections to the Parliament of the United Kingdom in Scottish constituencies
Unopposed ministerial by-elections to the Parliament of the United Kingdom in Scottish constituencies
January 1869 events